The 22nd season of Arthur started airing on PBS Kids in the United States from May 13, 2019 to May 16, 2019. Jane Lynch guest starred on the episode "Mr. Ratburn and the Special Someone." Roman Lutterotti replaced Jacob Ursomarzo as Arthur, Ethan Pugiotto replaced Christian Distefano as D.W., and Evan Blaylock replaced Max Friedman Cole as Brain.

Production
On March 28, 2018, Jessica Kardos, the voice of Sue Ellen Armstrong revealed on Twitter that she and Holly Gauthier-Frankel (the voice of Fern Walters) were recording new episodes of Arthur. New episodes were still being recorded as late as November 2018.

On May 25, 2018, Bruce Dinsmore (the voice of Binky Barnes, Mr. Read, and Bailey) confirmed that he had recorded new episodes, saying, "we got lots more coming" and "there's some good surprises." Dinsmore also revealed that that there will be a guest star this season, who is "an actress everyone would know."

The first official announce of Season 22 came on June 4, 2018 when Oasis Animation confirmed that it would produce four more seasons of Arthur, up to Season 25.

On November 16, 2018, Dinsmore announced on Twitter that he had recorded his "very last session" for Arthur. He later clarified that "he didn't intend to make an announcement of any kind," and that Arthur had "lots of new episodes coming."

This season has a total of eight segments instead of fourteen or thirteen.

Episodes

Notes

References

2019 American television seasons
2019 Canadian television seasons
Arthur (TV series) seasons